The Isolar II – The 1978 World Tour, more commonly known as The Low / Heroes World Tour or The Stage Tour, was a worldwide concert tour by David Bowie. The tour opened on 29 March 1978 at the San Diego Sports Arena continuing through North America, Europe and Australia before reaching a conclusion at the Nippon Budokan in Japan on 12 December 1978.

Tour development and song selection
Originally, Brian Eno planned to be a part of the tour band, but had to drop out due to health reasons. The band only had two weeks to rehearse for the tour. Carlos Alomar was the tour's band leader and drove the rehearsals.

The set list for the performances consisted of material from the previous year's albums, Low and "Heroes", with the second half of each performance opening with a five-song sequence from The Rise and Fall of Ziggy Stardust and the Spiders from Mars album. Bowie had the band learn the entirety of the Ziggy Stardust album in rehearsals, although most of the songs were never performed live on the tour. The instrumental track "Art Decade" typically followed the Ziggy Stardust tracks, a mellow track to follow the energy of the Ziggy Stardust material. Tracks from the 1976 album Station to Station were the closing numbers. In the late 1980s, Bowie regarded some of the songs he performed live on the tour as a bit "ponderous", referring specifically to some of the long instrumental performances such as "Warszawa."

A short intermission split a typical night's show into two parts, and for the second Bowie wore a snakeskin drapecoat and "huge baggy white pants."

Set design
The stark fluorescent tube lighting approach of the previous 1976 tour was further developed and expanded to create a large cage of tube lighting, which enclosed the stage with the ability to pulsate moodily during the slower instrumental pieces and flash frantically during the faster songs.

Tour incidents
The show in Marseille was disrupted by a blown PA (coincidentally during the song "Blackout").

The Australian leg of the tour included Bowie's first concert performances in Australia and his first large-scale outdoor concerts. For the first two dates, keyboardist Dennis Garcia substituted for Roger Powell, who had a previous commitment with Utopia.

Live recordings

The performances at Providence Civic Center, Boston Garden and Philadelphia Spectrum were recorded for the live album Stage. Tour pianist Sean Mayes recalled that for the show that night, they slowed the tempo down (of most songs) for the recording, the only night such a change was made.

The performance on 10 April 1978 at the Dallas Convention Center was filmed for a television special titled "David Bowie on Stage", where six songs were broadcast: "What in the World", "Blackout", "Sense of Doubt", "Speed of Life", "Hang On to Yourself", and "Ziggy Stardust". The performances at Earls Court in London, England were filmed by David Hemmings, with extracts broadcast on a British TV programme, The London Weekend Show. The film has yet to be released. The performance at the NHK Hall in Tokyo, Japan on 12 December 1978 was filmed and broadcast on Japanese TV's The Young Music Show.

The final night of the Earls Court performance was recorded by the RCA mobile unit with the live performance premiere of the song, "Sound and Vision", later released on the 1995 compilation album, Rarestonebowie. The song was not performed live again until the Sound+Vision Tour in 1990.

Record Store Day on 21 April 2018 saw the release of Welcome to the Blackout (Live London '78). It was recorded at Earls Court on 30 June and 1 July 1978.

The tour band remembered that "every show was taped" for Bowie's private use, and the tapes were carefully guarded by Alomar.

Setlist
This is the typical setlist for all tour dates except for some dates. Originally, the whole album The Rise and Fall of Ziggy Stardust and the Spiders from Mars was set to be performed in the middle of the setlist.
 "Warszawa"
 ""Heroes""
 "What in the World"
 "Be My Wife"
 "The Jean Genie"
 "Blackout"
 "Sense of Doubt"
 "Speed of Life"
 "Breaking Glass"
 "Beauty and the Beast"
 "Fame"
 "Five Years"
 "Soul Love"
 "Star"
 "Hang On to Yourself"
 "Ziggy Stardust"
 "Suffragette City"
 "Rock 'n' Roll Suicide"
 "Art Decade"
 "Station to Station"
 "Stay"
 "TVC 15"
Encore:
 "Rebel Rebel"

Tour band
David Bowie – vocals, chamberlin
Adrian Belew – lead guitar, backing vocals
Carlos Alomar – rhythm guitar, backing vocals, music director
George Murray – bass guitar, backing vocals
Dennis Davis – drums, percussion
Roger Powell – keyboards, Moog Taurus bass pedals, synthesizer, backing vocals (except 11–14 November 1978)
Dennis Garcia – keyboards, synthesizer (11–14 November 1978 only)
Sean Mayes – piano, string ensemble, backing vocals
Simon House – electric violin

Band road management, road crew, showco crew, personal staff
Jan Michael Alejandro – Band Tech (Pre Jan-Al Cases)
Vern "Moose" Constan – Band Tech
Rob Joyce – Stage Manager
Leroy Kerr – Band Tech
Edd Kolakowski – Piano and Keyboard Tech (Australia, New Zealand and Japan dates)
Buford Jones – FOH Mixer
Townsend Wessinger– Showco Sound Crew
Billy King– Showco Sound Crew
Russell Davis– Showco Sound Crew
Randy Marshall– Showco Sound Crew
Glenn George– Showco Sound Crew
Lonnie McKenzie – Showco 
Warren Cunningham – Showco Lighting Crew
Dean Heiser - Showco Lighting Crew
Dirk Arnold - Showco Lighting Crew
Rick Hunnicuut – Showco Lighting Crew
John Mitchell – Showco Lighting Crew
Juan Gonzales – Showco Lighting Crew
Kevin Di Piazza – Showco Lighting Crew
Richard Brown– Showco Lighting Crew
Kevin Randall– Showco Rigging Crew
J. Smith– Showco Rigging Crew
Lyle Centola– Showco Rigging Crew
Morris Lyda – Production Consultant/ Advance Mgr
David Bernstein – Cargo Guru (Pre Rock-it Cargo)
Mike Brady – Mr Bowie's Driver / Bodyguard
George, Stuart (Stuey) -Mr Bowie's Bodyguard
Eric "B" Barrett –Tour Manager / Lighting Designer
Ronn Roberts – Asst To The Tour Manager
Pat Gibbons – Tour Manager / Accountant
Truck Drivers (Europe) Richard Boote & Gwyn Lawrence 
Coco Schwab – Mr Bowie's Personal Assistant

Tour dates

Songs
 

From The Rise and Fall of Ziggy Stardust and the Spiders from Mars
 "Five Years"
 "Soul Love"
"Moonage Daydream" (Rehearsed but not performed)
"Starman" (Rehearsed but not performed)
"It Ain't Easy" (Rehearsed but not performed)
"Lady Stardust" (Rehearsed but not performed)
 "Star"
 "Hang On to Yourself"
 "Ziggy Stardust"
 "Suffragette City"
 "Rock 'n' Roll Suicide"
From Aladdin Sane
 "The Jean Genie"
From Diamond Dogs
 "Rebel Rebel"
From Young Americans
 "Fame" (Bowie, John Lennon, Carlos Alomar)

From Station to Station
 "Station to Station"
 "TVC 15"
 "Stay"
From Low
 "Speed of Life"
 "Breaking Glass" (Bowie, Dennis Davis, George Murray)
 "What in the World"
 "Sound and Vision"
 "Be My Wife"
 "Warszawa" (Bowie, Brian Eno)
 "Art Decade"
From "Heroes"
 "Beauty and the Beast"
 ""Heroes"" (Bowie, Eno)
 "Joe the Lion" (Rehearsed but not performed)
 "Blackout"
 "Sense of Doubt"
Other songs:
 "Alabama Song" (originally from Bertolt Brecht's opera Rise and Fall of the City of Mahagonny; written by Brecht and Kurt Weill; a non-album single later released in 1980)

Notes

References
 Pimm Jal de la Parra, David Bowie: The Concert Tapes, P.J. Publishing, 1985, 
 Kevin Cann, David Bowie: A Chronology, Vermilion, 1983, 
 David Buckley, Strange Fascination: The Definitive Biography of David Bowie, Virgin Books, 1999, 

David Bowie concert tours
1978 concert tours